The men's singles competition at the 2010 Asian Games in Guangzhou was held on 15 November 2010 at Tianhe Bowling Hall.

Schedule
All times are China Standard Time (UTC+08:00)

Results

References 

Results at ABF Website
Bowling Digital

External links
Bowling Site of 2010 Asian Games

Men's singles